Albert Victor Heal MC FRIBA (6 May 1887 – 1975) was an architect and designer based in England.

Life
He was born on 6 May 1887. He married Florence Isabel Reynolds.

He worked in the offices of Rattee and Kett from 1904 to 1906. He was articled to Bodley and Hare from 1906 to 1913. He was assistant to Richard T Creed from 1913. He took over the practice of Richard Creed on his death in 1914.

During the First World War he served with the Royal Field Artillery and Suffolk Yeomanry, and was awarded the Military Cross.

He was in partnership with Cecil Greenwood Hare between 1919 and 1924.

He was appointed a Fellow of the Royal Institute of British Architects in November 1927.

In the 1950s he entered partnership with R V Smith, and the company was known as Victor Heal & Partners.

Works

Little Bardfield Hall, Essex, restoration work 1919 – 1920
All Saints’ Church, Southsea, (with Cecil Greenwood Hare) 1922
32 Grosvenor Square West, restoration 1922 - 1923
Parham Park, Sussex, restoration, 1922 – 1925
Lazard's Bank, Old Broad Street, restoration (with Gunton & Gunton) 1926
St Mark's Church, Camberwell, 1931 (now New Peckham Mosque)
Higginson & Co, Cornhill and Lombard Street 1932
St Mildrid’s Church, Addiscombe 1933 (completed after the death of Cecil Greenwood Hare)
Parham Church, Sussex, restoration, 1933-1934
Euston House, Eversholt Street, 1934
Columbine hangar, East Cowes, Isle of Wight designed in May 1935 for Saunders-Roe Ltd
Fielden House, Little College Street, 1936
Oak Reredos, St Peter’s Church, Eastbourne 1936
Newspaper House, Victoria Road, Swindon 1937
Church Hall, St Augustine’s, Bromley Common 1938
The Shields Daily Gazette Offices, Barrington Street, South Shields 1938 (with F.W. Newby - demolished ca. 2014)
Fargate House, 21 Fargate, Sheffield 1938
Bank of England (Southampton?) 1940
Roborough House, Plymouth, 1941
Bank Buildings, 1 Lothbury, London, 1950s (now a branch of the Bank of China)
Wiggonholt Church, Sussex, restoration, 1952
Bank of England Chambers/New Change Buildings, New Change, London, 1953-1960 (Demolished)
Overbury Court, Worcestershire, additions. 1959
Bank, Princes Street, 1949-1962
Alterations to Baillie Scott House in Sevenoaks,Kent, 1968 by Victor Heal & Partners

References

1887 births
1975 deaths
British Army personnel of World War I
Suffolk Yeomanry officers
Architects from Suffolk
Fellows of the Royal Institute of British Architects
Recipients of the Military Cross